Masiwang River is a river of eastern Seram Island, Maluku province, Indonesia, about 2700 km northeast of the capital Jakarta.

Hydrology 
The Masiwang River flows through a wide valley, and is typically shallow, with a significant amount of sediment load. The watershed area of Masiwang is the largest in the eastern part of Seram island with an area of 1189.338 km². It flows into the sea on the southeast coast of Seram, between Tanjung Tioli, the eastern point of Waru Bay, and Tanjung Masiwang, forming a delta. The Masiwang and Seti languages are spoken in the vicinity.

Geography
The river flows in the eastern area of Seram island with predominantly tropical rainforest climate (designated as Af in the Köppen-Geiger climate classification). The annual average temperature in the area is 23 °C. The warmest month is March, when the average temperature is around 24 °C, and the coldest is July, at 21 °C. The average annual rainfall is 2814 mm. The wettest month is July, with an average of 422 mm rainfall, and the driest is October, with 95 mm rainfall.

See also
List of rivers of Indonesia
List of rivers of Maluku (province)

References

Rivers of Seram Island
Rivers of Indonesia